Sergey Shvagirev (born 4 April 1970) is a Soviet skier. He competed in the Nordic combined event at the 1992 Winter Olympics.

References

External links
 

1970 births
Living people
Soviet male Nordic combined skiers
Olympic Nordic combined skiers of the Unified Team
Nordic combined skiers at the 1992 Winter Olympics
Place of birth missing (living people)